Tilikum ( – January 6, 2017), nicknamed Tilly, was a captive male orca who spent most of his life at SeaWorld Orlando in Florida. He was captured in Iceland in 1983; about a year later, he was transferred to Sealand of the Pacific in Victoria, British Columbia. He was subsequently transferred in 1992 to SeaWorld in Orlando, Florida, where he sired 21 calves throughout his life. 

Tilikum was heavily featured in CNN Films' 2013 documentary Blackfish, which claims that orcas in captivity suffer psychological damage and become unnaturally aggressive. Of the four fatal attacks by orcas in captivity, Tilikum was involved in three: Keltie Byrne, a trainer at the now-defunct Sealand of the Pacific; Daniel P. Dukes, a man trespassing in SeaWorld Orlando; and SeaWorld trainer Dawn Brancheau.

Description 
Tilikum was the largest orca in captivity.

His name, in the Chinook Jargon of the Pacific Northwest, means "friends, relations, tribe, nation, common people".

Life

Origin 
Tilikum was captured when he was two years old, along with two other young orcas, by a purse-seine net in November 1983, at Berufjörður in eastern Iceland. After almost a year in a tank at the Hafnarfjördur Marine Zoo, he was transferred to Sealand of the Pacific, in Oak Bay, a suburb of the city of Victoria on Vancouver Island, Canada. At Sealand, he lived with two older female orcas named Haida II and Nootka IV. As a result of their matriarchal social structure, Tilikum was abused by Haida II and Nootka IV who behaved aggressively towards him, including forcing him into a smaller medical pool where trainers kept him for protection.

Fatalities 
While orca attacks on humans in the wild are rare, and no fatal attacks have been recorded, as of 2022 four humans have died due to interactions with captive orcas. Tilikum was involved in three of those deaths.

First death 

Keltie Lee Byrne was a Canadian student, animal trainer and competitive swimmer. She had been working with orcas Tilikum, Nootka IV, and Haida II at Sealand of the Pacific to earn extra money. On February 20, 1991, Byrne was working a shift when she slipped and fell into the whale pool. Witnesses recalled that Byrne screamed and panicked after realizing that one of the whales (later identified as Tilikum) was holding her foot and dragging her underwater. One witness described the theme park as looking unkempt, like a "gray theme park on its last legs, a kind of dingy swimming pool", and claimed to have heard Byrne screaming "I don't want to die!" while her eyes went wide in the water. According to the coroner's report, rescue attempts were thwarted by the whales, who refused to let Byrne go even after she was believed to have fallen unconscious in the water. Her corpse was later retrieved with a large net, after which she was determined to be deceased. Her death was ruled an accident.

Sealand of the Pacific went defunct in 1992, largely as a result of Byrne's death and allegations surfacing of physical and mental abuse of the whales in the park. Tilikum was sold to the United States' SeaWorld theme park chain for performance shows and breeding. The whale's semen was collected and used for artificial insemination to breed a number of captive orcas for SeaWorld's shows and also for its sister park, Loro Parque in Spain. 

Byrnes's death attracted renewed attention after the 2010 death of SeaWorld trainer Dawn Brancheau and the 2013 documentary Blackfish, when it was revealed that Tilikum had killed Byrne before later killing Daniel P. Dukes and later Brancheau; the two deaths occurred after Tilikum had been sold by then-defunct Sealand of the Pacific to SeaWorld's parks in the United States. Blackfish also revealed it is still unclear exactly what drove Tilikum and the other whales to attack Byrne, but suggested that years of abuse and cruelty towards Tilikum, including the act of allowing the other whales to "rake" Tilikum's skin with their teeth until he bled, had made him an aggressive whale. Steve Huxter, head of animal training at Sealand at the time, said "They never had a plaything in the pool that was so interactive. They just got incredibly excited and stimulated." No official motive of the three whales has ever been established, as the case was over twenty years old by the time it resurfaced in relation to the death of Dawn Brancheau.

Second death 

Daniel P. Dukes was a 27-year-old man from South Carolina and the second of three deaths attributed to Tilikum. SeaWorld has maintained that Dukes was a vagrant who climbed into Tilikum's pool and drowned, while the coroner's report, along with animal rights advocates for Tilikum, have pointed out that Dukes' corpse was found severely mutilated by the whale. Dukes is generally regarded by the media as a trespasser and nuisance rather than a direct victim of Tilikum, although this perception has been challenged with the release of the documentary Blackfish.

Little has been published in the media regarding the early life of Dukes. A known drifter with a love of nature and environmentalism, he was known for acts of petty theft and general vagrancy. These details were often brought up by SeaWorld. At some point in the night on July 6, 1999, Dukes, who had hidden in the SeaWorld theme park, emerged from elsewhere in the park and went to the whale pool where Tilikum resided. The following morning, his body was discovered in the water by SeaWorld staff, draped over Tilikum's backside as the whale swam around. As SeaWorld claims to have no security tape footage of the pool on that night, it is unclear exactly what transpired. According to the Orange County Sheriff's Office (OCSO) report, a 911 call was received from SeaWorld at 7:25 a.m., at almost the exact time that Dukes' body was spotted. OCSO immediately dispatched Detective Calhoun who arrived at SeaWorld eight minutes later. Dukes' corpse was retrieved and later identified. 

Dukes' parents filed a lawsuit against Seaworld two months after their son's death. This lawsuit was later dropped.

The 2013 documentary Blackfish was the first media to explore Dukes' death extensively. The lack of early relevant coverage of his death later became noted for the way that the media and investigators handle the deaths of homeless and mentally ill individuals, particularly the lack of dignity ascribed to such cases. The Dolphin Project argued against SeaWorld's unflattering description of Dukes as a filthy man with poor hygiene spotted at the park mumbling oddly to himself, stating that "Daniel Dukes was a troubled individual with a history of petty thefts, and questionable decisions but as a human being, no death is meaningless. Unwittingly, Dukes will forever be remembered as Tilikum's second victim and SeaWorld's first major incident."

The case of Dukes' death has become a frequent example in arguments over the welfare of marine mammals in captivity. Marine mammal trainer Ric O'Barry argued that Dukes was probably not near Tilikum's tank with any form of malicious intent, but instead that the nature-loving man was "fascinated" by the whale and wanted to visit it. He further argued, "I think the whale probably pulled [Dukes] down, held him underwater. I don't think they know how often we breathe. The problem is that the whales have nothing better to do," O'Barry explains. "They're bored. We literally bore them to death. It's like you living in the bathroom for your life."

Third death 

On February 24, 2010, Tilikum killed Dawn Brancheau, a 40-year-old SeaWorld trainer. Brancheau was killed following a Dine with Shamu show. The veteran trainer was rubbing Tilikum as part of a post-show routine when the orca grabbed her by her ponytail and pulled her into the water. Some witnesses reported seeing Tilikum grab Brancheau by the arm or shoulder. He reportedly scalped her, then bit off her arm and swallowed it during the attack. Brancheau's autopsy indicated death by drowning and blunt force trauma. Brancheau's death resulted in a contentious legal case over the safety of working with orcas and the ethics of keeping live whales and other marine mammals in captivity.

Return to performing 
Tilikum returned to performing on March 30, 2011. High-pressure water hoses were used to massage him, rather than hands, and removable guardrails were used on the platforms, as OSHA has restricted close contact between orcas and trainers and reinforced workplace safety precautions after Brancheau's death. He was paired with his grandson Trua and was often seen performing alongside him during the finale of the new One Ocean show. He had on occasion been kept with his daughter Malia, or both Trua and Malia at the same time. In December 2011, he was put on hiatus from the shows following an undisclosed illness. He resumed performing in April 2012.

Declining health and death 
SeaWorld announced in March 2016 that Tilikum's health was deteriorating, and it was thought he had a lung infection due to bacterial pneumonia. In May 2016, it was reported Tilikum's health was improving. On January 6, 2017, SeaWorld announced that Tilikum had died early in the morning. The cause of death was reported as a bacterial infection.

Offspring 

Tilikum sired 21 offspring in captivity, 11 of which were reported alive in November 2013.

While at Sealand of the Pacific, Tilikum sired his first calf when he was about eight or nine years old. His first son, Kyuquot, was born to Haida II on December 24, 1991. Just a few months prior to the birth of Kyuquot, Tilikum was involved in the first incident involving a death. Seaworld requested an emergency transfer of Tilikum to their facility.

Following his arrival at SeaWorld, Tilikum sired many calves with many different females. His first calf born in Orlando was to Katina. Katina gave birth to Taku on September 9, 1993. Taku died on October 17, 2007.

Among Tilikum's other offspring are: Nyar (born 1993, died 1996), Unna (1996–2015), Sumar (1998–2010), Tuar (1999), Tekoa (2000), Nakai (2001-2022), Kohana (2002-2022), Ikaika (2002), Skyla (2004-2021), Malia (2007), Sakari (2010) and Makaio (2010).

In 1999, Tilikum began training for artificial insemination. In early 2000, Kasatka who resided at SeaWorld San Diego was artificially inseminated using his sperm. She gave birth to Tilikum's son, Nakai, on September 1, 2001. On May 3, 2002, another female in San Diego, named Takara, bore Tilikum's calf through artificial insemination. Tilikum was also the first successful, surviving grandfather orca in captivity with the births of Trua (2005), Nalani (2006), Adán (2010) and Victoria (2012–2013).

Controversy 
On December 7, 2010, TMZ reported that SeaWorld's president, Terry Prather, received a letter from PETA and Mötley Crüe member Tommy Lee referencing SeaWorld's announcement regarding limiting human contact with Tilikum. In the letter, Lee refers to Tilikum as SeaWorld's "Chief Sperm Bank" and asserts that the relevant process constitutes continued human contact. The letter implores SeaWorld to release Tilikum from his tank, stating, "I hope it doesn't take another tragic death for SeaWorld to realize it shouldn't frustrate these smart animals by keeping them [confined] in tanks." On December 8, 2010, the SeaWorld VP of Communications responded to Lee's letter via E! News, stating that PETA's facts were not only inaccurate, but that SeaWorld trainers also "do not now, nor have they ever entered the water with Tilikum for this purpose".

Tilikum and the captivity of orcas is the main subject of the documentary film Blackfish, which premiered at the Sundance Film Festival in January 2013 and caused a drop in SeaWorld attendance and revenue. The film and a subsequent online petition led to several popular musical groups cancelling performances at SeaWorld and Busch Gardens' "Bands, Brew & BBQ" event in 2014.

In popular culture 
Aside from Blackfish, a number of non-fiction and fiction books have been written about Tilikum:

Non-fiction 
 Beneath the Surface: Killer Whales, Seaworld, and the Truth Beyond Blackfish by John Hargrove and Howard Chua-Eoan
 Death at SeaWorld: Shamu and the Dark Side of Killer Whales in Captivity by David Kirby

Fiction 
 The Case of the Sea World Adventure ("The Adventures of Mary-Kate and Ashley") by Cathy East Dubowski
 "Tilikum Bliss" (short story featured in Listen Is Silent, Or, The Usurer) by Rebecca Maye Holiday

See also 
 Tilikum v. Sea World
 Incidents at SeaWorld parks
 List of individual cetaceans

References

External links 

 Orcahome
 Center for Whale Research
 

1981 animal births
2017 animal deaths
Individual orcas
SeaWorld Orlando